Georgia Power is an electric utility headquartered in Atlanta, Georgia, United States. It was established as the Georgia Railway and Power Company and began operations in 1902 running streetcars in Atlanta as a successor to the Atlanta Consolidated Street Railway Company.

Georgia Power is the largest of the four electric utilities that are owned and operated by Southern Company. Georgia Power is an investor-owned, tax-paying public utility that serves more than 2.4 million customers in all but four of Georgia's 159 counties. It employs approximately 9,000 workers throughout the state. The Georgia Power Building, its primary corporate office building, is located at 241 Ralph McGill Boulevard in downtown Atlanta.

In 2006, the Savannah Electric & Power Company, a separate subsidiary of Southern Company, was merged into Georgia Power.

History 

Originally the Georgia Railway and Power Company, it began in 1902 as a company running the streetcars in Atlanta and was the successor to the Atlanta Consolidated Street Railway Company. In the 1930s, the company published a free newsletter called Two Bells which was distributed on its streetcars. Two Bells was carried on being distributed into the 1960s on the buses of a successor Atlanta Transit Company (ATC). From 1937 until 1950, Georgia Power also operated trolleybuses in Atlanta, and in 1950 its network of 31 electric bus routes was the largest trolley bus system in the United States. After the Atlanta transit strike of 1950, the Atlanta Transit Company took over operations. Atlanta Streetcar was formed in the 2000s to establish a new streetcar service along Peachtree Street.

The company built several dams, including the Morgan Falls Dam just north of the city, and some as far away as the Tallulah River in the northeast Georgia mountains. These hydroelectric dams form Lake Burton, Lake Seed, Lake Rabun, Lake Tallulah Falls, Lake Tugalo, and Lake Yonah, the last two of which straddle the Georgia – South Carolina border on the Tugaloo River.

Following cost increases in August 2018 for building two additional nuclear reactors at its Vogtle Electric Generating Plant, credit rating agency Moody's downgraded Georgia Power's credit ratings from A3 (upper medium) to Baa1 (lower medium).

In September 2018, in order to sustain the project, Georgia Power agreed to pay an additional proportion of the costs of the smaller project partners if completion costs exceeded $9.2 billion.

In 2019, Georgia Power's CEO, Paul Bowers, testified before state regulators seeking to get an approval for the company's request to add about $200 a year to the average residential customer's bills.
In June 2021, Georgia Power again sought a $235 million a year rates increase once Vogtle unit 3 starts operation, an overall 10% increase in rates, to recover capital construction costs and operating costs.

Oil Pollution Prevention Violation 
In August 2022, the EPA fined Georgia Power $1,906 after an Atlanta facility failed an audit for oil spill prevention. Among other violations, it was found that Georgia Power had no method of predicting a potential oil spill, no containment plan, and inadequate facility drainage.

Coal power

Georgia Power operates the Robert W. Scherer Power Plant, also known as Plant Scherer, in Monroe County, Georgia. According to Natural History Magazine, in 2006 Plant Scherer was the largest single point-source for carbon dioxide emissions in the United States. It was also ranked the 20th in the world in terms of carbon dioxide emissions by the Center for Global Development on its list of global power plants in November 2007. It was the only power plant in the United States that was listed among the world's top 25 carbon dioxide producers.

Transmission system
Georgia Power utilizes transmission lines carrying 115,000 volts, 230,000 volts and 500,000 volts. Georgia Power has interconnections with the Tennessee Valley Authority to the north, sister company Alabama Power to the west, Dominion Energy and Duke Energy to the east, and Florida Power & Light, Duke, and the city of Tallahassee to the south.

Transition to renewables and Plant Mitchell shutdown

Georgia Power asked the state's public service commission for approval to convert the coal-fired Plant Mitchell to run on wood fuel. If approved, the retrofit would have begun in 2011 and the biomass plant would have started operating in mid-2012. The  biomass plant would have run on surplus wood from suppliers within a  radius of the plant, which is located near Albany, Georgia.

Generating facilities
Georgia Power owns and operates a total of 46 generating plants which include hydroelectric dams, fossil fueled generating plants and nuclear power plants, which provide electricity to more than 2.4 million customers in all but four of Georgia's counties.

Hydroelectric dams
Georgia Power Hydro incorporates 19 hydro electric generating units to produce a generation capacity of 1,087,536 kilowatts (KW).

Fossil fuel power plants

Nuclear power plants

References

Notes
 Kurtz, Wilber, "Technical Advisor: The Making of Gone With The Wind. The Hollywood Journals", Atlanta Historical Journal, Vol. XXII, No.2, Summer, 1978.

External links

Southern Company
Georgia Power historical marker
Georgia Railway and Power Company Trolley Waiting Station historical marker

 
Companies based in Atlanta
Electric power companies of the United States
Companies listed on the New York Stock Exchange
Energy infrastructure in Georgia (U.S. state)
1945 establishments in Georgia (U.S. state)
Hydroelectric power companies of the United States
Nuclear power companies of the United States
Energy companies established in 1945
Non-renewable resource companies established in 1945
Southern Company
Energy in Georgia (U.S. state)